George Gross, O.Ont (born Juraj Gross; January 23, 1923 – March 21, 2008) was a Slovak-born Canadian sports journalist and soccer executive. He worked for several newspapers, most notably the Toronto Sun. He was a co-founder of the Eastern Canada Professional Soccer League.

Early life
Gross was born in Bratislava, Slovakia in January 1923. As a journalist in Bratislava, he had been jailed by the post-Second World War communist regime in Czechoslovakia for his political views. He eventually escaped from Austria by rowing, or swimming, across the Danube River. Upon arriving in Canada, he earned a position as a farm hand but was unable to work the Cultivator.

Career
After being fired as a farm hand, Gross accepted a freelance position with the Toronto Telegram, where he was eventually hired full-time in 1959. Once the Telegram went bankrupt, he became the first sports editor at the Toronto Sun. During his time with the Telegram and Sun, Gross won the 1974 National Newspaper Award, Dunlop Award, and authored three books.

In 1985, Gross was inducted into the Hockey Hall of Fame, winning the Elmer Ferguson Memorial Award. The next year, Gross was promoted to corporate sports editor with a weekly column. In 1994, he received the Olympic Order, and he was inducted into the Slovak Hockey Hall of Fame as well as the Etobicoke Sports Hall of Fame in 2002. In 2003, he was presented with the Order of Ontario. In 2005, Gross was inducted into the Canadian Sports Hall of Fame, and in April 2006, Gross was inducted as a builder into the Canada Soccer Hall of Fame.

In 2004, the Toronto Sun began its annual George Gross/Toronto Sun Sportsperson of the Year award.

Shortly after his death in 2008, the Canadian Soccer Association created the George Gross Memorial Trophy, awarded to the most valuable player of the annual Canadian Championship. As well, Tennis Canada announced renamed the Rexall Centre the George Gross Media Centre.

Footnotes

External links 
 Canadian Soccer Hall of Fame inductee page
 Sun Media: Sun legend George Gross dies

1923 births
2008 deaths
Canadian male journalists
Canada Soccer Hall of Fame inductees
Canadian sports builders
Czechoslovak emigrants to Canada
Elmer Ferguson Award winners
Ice hockey people from Ontario
Journalists from Toronto
Members of the Order of Ontario
Soccer people from Ontario
Canadian people of Slovak descent
People from Etobicoke
Toronto Sun people
Czechoslovak defectors